Big Brother 20 is the 20th season of the American reality television series Big Brother. It is based upon the Dutch series of the same name.

It was renewed in August 2016 as part of a double renewal for seasons 19 and 20. Julie Chen, credited as Julie Chen Moonves from episode 35 onwards, returned as host.

Sixteen new competitors, known as HouseGuests, were announced to be competing and their identities were released in June 2018. Each week in the game, HouseGuests compete in a series of competitions to win power and safety, they then vote to eliminate, or "evict", one of their own until there are only two remaining. In the finale episode, previous House Guests vote on who they think they should win the game, with the House Guest who receives the most votes being declared the winner.

The season premiered on June 27, 2018 on CBS in the United States and concluded on September 26, 2018. The season also received many controversies and criticisms throughout the season, but received mostly positive viewing figures. Despite an uncertain future for the show, CBS began accepting applications for a future season in September 2018. After 99 days in the Big Brother House, Kaycee Clark became the winner of Big Brother in a 5–4 vote over Tyler Crispen. Crispen was also named America's Favorite HouseGuest.

Format 
Big Brother follows a group of contestants, known as HouseGuests, who live inside a custom-built house outfitted with cameras and microphones recording their every move 24 hours a day. The HouseGuests are sequestered with no contact with the outside world. During their stay, the HouseGuests share their thoughts on their day-to-day lives inside the house in a private room known as the Diary Room. Each week, the HouseGuests compete in competitions in order to win power and safety inside the house. At the start of each week, the HouseGuests compete in a Head of Household (abbreviated as "HOH") competition. The winner of the HoH competition is immune from eviction and  selects two HouseGuests to be nominated for eviction. Six HouseGuests are then selected to compete in the Power of Veto (abbreviated as "PoV") competition: the reigning HoH, the nominees, and three other HouseGuests chosen by random draw. The winner of the PoV competition has the right to either revoke the nomination of one of the nominated HouseGuests or leave them as is. If the veto winner uses this power, the HoH must immediately nominate another HouseGuest for eviction. The PoV winner is also immune from being named as the replacement nominee. On eviction night, all HouseGuests vote to evict one of the nominees, though the Head of Household and the nominees are not allowed to vote. This vote is conducted in the privacy of the Diary Room. In the event of a tie, the Head of Household casts the tie-breaking vote. The nominee with the most votes is evicted from the house. The last nine evicted HouseGuests comprise the Jury and are sequestered in a separate location following their eviction and ultimately decide the winner of the season. The Jury is only allowed to see the competitions and ceremonies that include all of the remaining HouseGuests; they are not shown any interviews or other footage that might include strategy or details regarding nominations. All evicted HouseGuests are eligible to win this award except for those who either voluntarily leave or are forcibly removed for rule violations.

HouseGuests

The HouseGuests were announced on Monday, June 18 at 7 AM PDT through the CBS website. Among the HouseGuests was Miss Missouri USA 2017 Bayleigh Dayton.

Other appearances
Kaycee Clark, Tyler Crispen, and Kaitlyn Herman all appeared on Big Brother 21 to host separate Power of Veto competitions. JC Mounduix, Tyler Crispen, and Kaycee Clark also returned in Episode 39 of Big Brother 21 to give their thoughts on the season and who they thought would win. In 2020, both Tyler Crispen and Bayleigh Dayton returned as contestants for Big Brother: All-Stars. 

All evicted HouseGuests appeared on the Facebook Watch exclusive Off the Block with Ross and Marissa for an extended interview following their evictions.

Tyler Crispen appeared on the second episode of TKO: Total Knock Out as a contestant. He finished in third place and received .

Swaggy C Williams, Bayleigh Dayton, Winston Hines, and Brett Robinson all filmed a promotional video for Love Island, which aired during Big Brother 21. Hines also appeared as a contestant on Love Islands first season. He entered the villa on Day 9 and was dumped on Day 17.

Kaycee Clark, Fessy Shafaat, Bayleigh Dayton, and Swaggy C Williams appeared on The Challenge: Total Madness. Clark and Shafaat returned for The Challenge: Double Agents, The Challenge: Spies, Lies & Allies and The Challenge: Ride or Dies.

In 2022, Angela Rummans appeared on The Challenge: USA and Robinson appeared on the fifth season of The Circle

Episodes

Twists
This season's main theme and twists centered on technology.

BB App Store
For the first three weeks, viewers were asked a series of questions about their opinions on the remaining House Guests. The House Guest who was named in the most overall answers was deemed the "top trending" House Guest of the week and earned a "Power App", which would give them an advantage in the game, while the House Guest who was answered the least was deemed "least trending" was given a "Crap App", which gave them a punishment. Once HouseGuests received an app, they were no longer eligible to receive one in the future.

H@cker Competition
On Day 44, following Rachel's eviction, a new twist was unleashed on the HouseGuests called the "H@cker Competition". It lets one HouseGuest hack the game for a week. After the nominations, all of the HouseGuests compete in a competition at the same time in different rooms, making the winner anonymous to the other HouseGuests. The winner of the competition is able to "hack" the game in three different ways:
 First, they can replace one of the Head of Household's nominations and change it to someone of their choosing.
 Second, they get to select one of the three participants chosen for the Power of Veto competition.
 Finally, they can nullify one vote at the live eviction.

Jury Battleback
The first four Jury members had the opportunity to battle each other for a chance to return to the game. The competition between Bayleigh, Rockstar, Scottie, and Fessy aired on August 30, 2018 in episode 29 following the live eviction. Scottie was the winner and returned to the game.

Voting history
Technology Winner
The Technology Winner refers to the special competition or event that takes place on the Sunday episode of the show.
 For Weeks 1-3, the BB App Store was in play. The most trending HouseGuest received a "Power App" (a Secret Advantage in the game).
 In Week 6 & 7, the #H@cker Competition was in play. The winner of the competition became the "Hacker" and earned the power to remove one of the HoH's nominations (represented by strikethrough) and secretly replace them with their own (represented in bold).  The Hacker also chose one HouseGuest to compete in the veto competition, and blocked one HouseGuest from voting at the eviction ceremony.

Notes

 :  As the winner of the Opening Competition, Swaggy C was able to grant immunity to two move-in groups; he chose group 3 (Haleigh, Scottie, Fessy, and Kaycee) and group 4 (Rachel, Swaggy C, Brett, and Rockstar). 
 :  Kaitlyn competed to return to the house, but was unsuccessful and was officially evicted.
 : This player's nomination for eviction was cancelled by the winner of the H@cker Competition.
 : This player was nominated for eviction by the winner of the H@cker Competition.
 :  This player was blocked from voting at the eviction ceremony by the winner of the H@cker Competition.
 :  Bayleigh, Rockstar, Scottie, and Fessy competed for an opportunity to come back into the game. Scottie won the competition and re-entered the house on Day 72.
 : This week was a Double Eviction week. Following the first eviction, the remaining HouseGuests played a week's worth of Big Brother, including HoH and Veto competitions, and nomination, veto and eviction ceremonies, during the live show, culminating in a second eviction for the week.
 : As Head of Household, Kaycee chose to evict JC.
 : During the finale, the Jury voted for the winner of Big Brother.

Production

Development
The series was announced in August 2016 as part of a double renewal for Big Brother 19 and Big Brother 20. Along with the series the 24/7 live feeds returned with a CBS All Access subscription and Big Brother: After Dark also returned on Pop. The season is produced by Endemol Shine North America and Fly on the Wall Entertainment. Julie Chen returned as host and Allison Grodner as well as Rich Meehan returned as Executive Producers. CBS began allowing online applications in September 2017, however open casting calls did not begin until March 2018. Celebrity Big Brother winner and runner up Marissa Jaret Winokur and Ross Mathews host a new companion show known as Off the Block with Ross and Marissa following the end of former House Guest Jeff Schroeder's Big Brother Live Chat.

Prize
The HouseGuest compete for a grand prize of $500,000, among other rewards and luxuries given out during the season, including a $25,000 award for the America's Favorite HouseGuest fan-favorite poll in the finale.

Reception

Controversies
Joseph Charles "JC" Mounduix received criticism after he was shown using an ice cream scoop on the genitals of his other HouseGuests. Mounduix later told fellow HouseGuest Kaycee Clark to open up her vagina, saying that it "feels good".

Viewers questioned Angela Rummans and Rachel Swindler after they were caught on the live feeds making some questionable remarks. Rummans referred to her uneven tan lines as looking "ghetto", while Swindler compared her uneven tan lines to the skintone of fellow HouseGuest Bayleigh Dayton, who is African American. CBS later released a statement and warned Rummans and Swindler with future consequences.

Since the start of the live feeds, Kaitlyn Herman had been criticized from viewers for her feelings and actions towards several men in the Big Brother House, while being in a five-year relationship outside of the house. In Week 3, Herman's then-boyfriend released a statement on Twitter, stating that he wanted to distance himself from the show and situation.

Kaitlyn Herman and Joseph Charles "JC" Mounduix both came under fire after they used the n-word in separate occasions. Herman used the word as she was singing the lyrics of a Drake song. Mounduix used the word after fellow HouseGuest Bayleigh Dayton, who is African American, asked Mounduix if there is a "difference between a midget and a dwarf". Offended, Mounduix said that the word "midget" is a derogatory term and then compared it to the n-word. Many came to the defense of the two, saying that they did not use the word towards someone. Herman later apologized for using the word on an Instagram live stream.

Joseph Charles "JC" Mounduix was criticized by fans after he asked Rachel Swindler if she was transgender, stating that she has "a big Adam's apple." Mounduix proceeded to feel Swindler's neck, but she told him to stop. Moments later, he began to touch Swindler's neck again before being stopped by her.

Viewers perceived some of Bayleigh Dayton's comments about Faysal Shafaat as being anti-Muslim. After Shafaat, a Muslim, complained about his in-house crush Haleigh Broucher talking about her past sexual experiences, Dayton claimed in private that Shafaat should "go find a virgin" and that he should "go to Pakistan and [get himself] one" because "that's what they do." Many viewers interpreted "they" as meaning Muslims.

Joseph Charles "JC" Mounduix was criticized by both fans and his fellow housemates for making light of the #MeToo movement after making jokes at the movement's expense.

Joseph Charles "JC" Mounduix was once again involved in two separate sexual misconduct incidents in which he was accused of sexual harassment and sexual assault. While sleeping in the same bed, Mounduix was seen caressing Tyler Crispen's arm, face, and chest, as well as kissing his armpit while Crispen was sleeping. The following morning Crispen stated to Kaycee Clark "I'm sleeping alone tonight — JC is not sleeping with me". Mounduix explained his version by stating that he was "comforting Crispen who was having nightmares". Later, Mounduix opened the toilet door while HouseGuest Haleigh Broucher was using it. Broucher repeatedly asked Mounduix to close the door, who refused and tied the door open. Broucher then yelled for assistance from production and later filed a complaint with executive producer Allison Grodner. The producers later released a statement saying that neither Crispen nor Broucher filed official complaints and that the two had expressed to them that they "did not feel threatened or unsafe by Mounduix's actions."

During a live eviction speech, HouseGuest Scottie Salton made sexual and vulgar comments towards HouseGuests Tyler Crispen and Angela Rummans. He hinted that Crispen received oral sex from Rummans, which got censored out by CBS.

Ratings
Unless noted below, all episode aired in the United States on Sundays and Wednesdays at 8:00 Eastern Standard Time (7:00 Central Standard Time) and live Thursdays at 9:00 EST (8:00 CST).

 : Episode 21 was delayed to 8:20 PM EST (7:20 PM CST) due to the 2018 PGA Championship golf event running long.
 : Episode 36 was delayed to 8:37 PM EST (7:37 PM CST) due to the New England Patriots-Jacksonville Jaguars game running long.

Future of the series
The American adaptation of Big Brother has aired on CBS since its inception on July 5, 2000 with Julie Chen as host. Following two articles published by The New Yorker by Ronan Farrow in July and September 2018, where several women accused Chen's husband Les Moonves of harassment, intimidation, and sexual misconduct, effective September 9, 2018, Moonves departed CBS Corporation as President, Chairman and CEO, with Joseph Ianniello appointed as President and Acting CEO. In response to the claims against him, Moonves released a statement denying the allegations. After the first article was published, Chen released a statement on Twitter in July defending her husband.

While Chen was initially confirmed to return to the ninth season of her other CBS show The Talk, she was absent from the season premiere that aired on September 10, 2018. Chen issued a statement where she was taking a few days off, but would continue with Big Brother. Chen's first television appearance since Moonves' departure was the live eviction on September 13, 2018, where she closed out the episode with "From outside the Big Brother house...I'm Julie Chen Moonves, good night." The new sign-off broke with an established pattern that Chen has used in the past on Big Brother and showcased her support for her husband, while it received a mixed response from fans and viewers on Twitter. Chen subsequently announced her departure from The Talk in a pre-recorded segment that aired on the September 18, 2018 episode, where she stood outside the Big Brother house. Chen will continue to host Big Brother.

The 20th season had been confirmed since August 10, 2016 as part of a two-year renewal between CBS and Fly on the Wall Entertainment, in association with Endemol Shine North America.Celebrity Big Brother was renewed for a second season on May 12, 2018 during CBS' annual upfront for the 2018–19 television season. Speculation on the status of the show intensified after the departure of Moonves from CBS, with fans of the show and former HouseGuests began spreading the hashtag #SaveBBUSA in an attempt to get the program renewed. Unnamed insiders close to the production of the show have cast doubt if Chen would return to host potential future installments if CBS renews the show. In an article from US Weekly, an insider noted that Big Brother 2 winner Will Kirby, Celebrity Big Brother 1 runner-up Ross Mathews, and Big Brother Canada host Arisa Cox have been mentioned as potential replacements in the event that Chen does not to return, while TMZ reported that Chen will continue with the show if the network decides to renew it.

CBS began accepting online applications for a 21st season on September 20, 2018. After a few months of uncertainty, CBS officially announced that season 21 would go on during the summer.

References

External links
  – official American site
  – official Canadian site
 

2018 American television seasons
20